Mayday Parade is an American rock band from Tallahassee, Florida. Their debut EP Tales Told by Dead Friends was released in 2006, and sold over 50,000 copies without any label support. In July 2007, Mayday Parade released their debut album A Lesson in Romantics. After signing to Fearless in 2006, the band also signed onto a major label with Atlantic in 2009. Their second studio album, Anywhere but Here was released in October 2009 and their third album, entitled Mayday Parade, was released in October 2011. Mayday Parade's fourth album, titled Monsters in the Closet, was released in October 2013. Their fifth album, titled Black Lines, was released October 2015. In April 2018, the band signed to Rise Records and released their sixth studio album Sunnyland on June 15, 2018. Their seventh studio album What It Means To Fall Apart, was released in 2021.

History

Early years and Tales Told by Dead Friends (2005–2006)
Mayday Parade was formed in the winter of 2005 following the merger of two local Tallahassee bands, Kid Named Chicago and Defining Moment. Kid Named Chicago featured vocalist/guitarist Jason Lancaster, guitarist Alex Garcia and drummer Jake Bundrick, while Defining Moment featured vocalist Derek Sanders, guitarist Brooks Betts, and bassist Jeremy Lenzo. Both bands previously practiced in the same building, before it occurred to Lenzo that it "made more sense if we put them together instead of playing separately."

Still arguing over a name, the band went into the studio to record their first EP Tales Told by Dead Friends, on November 7, 2006, with producer Lee Dyess. They decided on the band name Mayday Parade during the week they spent recording in the studio. The band went on their first U.S. tour with Brandtson and Mêlée, then on another tour with Plain White T's shortly after the release of the EP.

A Lesson in Romantics and Lancaster's departure (2007–2008)

In January 2007, the band started to record their debut studio album, A Lesson in Romantics. In April, shortly after the album was completed, lead singer Jason Lancaster left the band citing a lack of writing credit on the band's releases. The album was released on July 11, 2007. "When I Get Home, You're So Dead" was one of the first songs the band wrote. Mayday Parade supported their album on the 2007 Vans Warped Tour. The band made their first UK appearance in April 2008 performing at the Give it a Name festival in Sheffield and London. The band played the 2008 Vans Warped Tour and toured with All Time Low, The Maine, and Every Avenue in Fall 2008 on The Compromising of Integrity, Morality, and Principles in Exchange for Money Tour.

Anywhere but Here (2009–2010)
The band began writing their new record in December 2008, the first writing process as a band without lyricist Lancaster. The band finished recording in June 2009. The band signed onto a major label with Atlantic in 2009. The title track, "Anywhere But Here", was posted on their MySpace on July 28, along with a blog explaining that the first single of the new album will be called "The Silence", and would be released on August 11, 2009. On August 4, "The Silence" was released on Mayday Parade's MySpace and through iTunes. On September 9, Mayday Parade released another song from the album called "Kids in Love" to their MySpace page. The new album, entitled Anywhere But Here, was released on October 6, 2009.

Mayday Parade co-headlined both the 2009 Fall Ball tour with The Academy Is..., with supporting acts such as You Me at Six, The Secret Handshake, and Set Your Goals and the 2010 Take Action Tour along with We the Kings, A Rocket to the Moon, and There for Tomorrow. The band also played the 2010 Vans Warped Tour.
The band covered the song "We Are the Champions" by Queen for the compilation album Punk Goes Classic Rock, released on April 27, 2010. They also recorded a cover of "In My Head" by Jason Derülo for the next release in the franchise, Punk Goes Pop 3, which was released on November 2, 2010.

Valdosta EP and Mayday Parade (2011–2012)
In 2011, the band released an EP, entitled Valdosta (named after Valdosta, GA) that contained six tracks, including 2 brand new tracks titled "Amber Lynn" and "Terrible Things". The EP contained acoustic versions of "Kids in Love" and "Bruised and Scarred" from their second full-length studio album Anywhere But Here, "Your Song" from their Tales Told by Dead Friends and "Jamie All Over" from A Lesson in Romantics. Valdosta was released through Atlantic and Fearless Records on March 8, 2011. On March 10, Songkick recognized Mayday Parade as the hardest-working band of 2010, with 194 bookings and 74,000 miles logged in the entire year, with Willie Nelson and Lady Gaga ranking No. 7 and No. 8 in comparison. Mayday Parade played all the dates on the Australian 2009 Soundwave Festival. The band also played Slam Dunk Festival (both North and South) in Leeds and Hatfield (UK) on 28 and 29 May 2009, coinciding with their UK tour with A Rocket to the Moon and We Are the In Crowd.

Written by the band in a beach house in Panacea, Florida, the self-titled album was produced by Zack Odom and Kenneth Mount, who also produced A Lesson in Romantics. Kenneth Mount tweeted a picture of the album's tentative track list on April 13, 2011. Lead singer Derek Sanders also stated that "Oh Well, Oh Well" would likely be the first track. Four days later, Jake Bundrick, the drummer of Mayday Parade, tweeted to confirm that their third full-length album had been completed. On July 6, 2011, Mayday Parade announced that they would be releasing their new self-titled album on October 4, 2011. They also released the track listing, revealing that the album had 12 songs. On July 27, Mayday Parade premiered the track "Oh Well, Oh Well" for the first time online at Alternative Press. On September 4, it was posted on Mayday Parade's Facebook page that they would be releasing a song from the new album, called "When You See My Friends" via iTunes on September 9. This was posted followed by a series of pictures of the band captioned with lyrics from the song.

On October 4, 2011, Mayday Parade released their new self-titled album, which quickly reached No. 5 on the iTunes albums list.
Also on October 5, 2011, Mayday Parade released their new music video for "Oh Well, Oh Well" Directed by Thunder Down Country. The animated video won the  award for Best Music Video of 2011. On April 4, 2012, the band released the music video for the single "Stay". On May 1, 2012, the debut album "A Lesson In Romantics" was released on vinyl. There was a set of 1500 "First Edition" album sets that featured the vinyl in red rather than the traditional black. On July 22, 2012, on a video post via Alternative Press lead singer Derek Sanders said the band would start writing a new album in December or January. Together with Californian Rock musician Vic Fuentes they charted with a cover of Gotye's "Somebody That I Used To Know", which is on the fifth album of the "Punk Goes Pop..." series in the US-Rockcharts.

Monsters in the Closet (2013–2014)

On January 10, 2013, the Band announced they would be heading back into the studio to release their fourth studio album, Monsters in the Closet, via Fearless records. It will be available in Autumn 2013. Mayday Parade has recorded 15 tracks with the intention of putting 12 on the album; the remaining 3 may be used as b-sides. On June 26, 2013, Jake Bundrick tweeted that the band had finished recording the album. On July 29, 2013, Mayday Parade announced they will be headlining the Glamor Kills Tour 2013 and that their upcoming fourth album is entitled Monsters In The Closet and will be released October 8, 2013.

On August 21, 2013, the track list from the album was posted. On August 27, 2013, the band released their first single "Ghosts" from the album, Monsters in the Closet. On September 17, 2013, the band released their second single "Girls." On October 2, 2013, the band released a preview of the upcoming album. On October 8, 2013, the CD "Monsters In The Closet" was released. On November 18, 2013, the video for "Ghosts" was released. The band covered Bush's song "Comedown" for the compilation album Punk Goes 90's 2. They played the full 2014 Vans Warped Tour.

A deluxe version of "Monsters in the Closet", with new songs included, was released by Fearless Records on May 27, 2014.

Black Lines and reissues (2014–2017)
On July 24, 2014, the band announced they will be making a fifth studio album to be released in 2015. A tour during late 2014 also happened, entitled The Honeymoon Tour, with supporting acts Tonight Alive, PVRIS and Major League.  According to an issue of Alternative Press, the band is currently recording with Mike Sapone (Brand New, Taking Back Sunday, Sainthood Reps) and was scheduled to be released sometime in the fall of 2015. The band also tweeted "MAYDAY PARADE 5 IS DONE" in late February of that year, indicating that they had finished their 5th studio album. On July 17, 2015, Mayday Parade announced that their new album Black Lines would be released on October 9 through Fearless. At the second annual Alternative Press Music Awards on July 22, it was announced the Alternative Press Tour would be revived, with Mayday Parade headlining and supporting acts Real Friends, This Wild Life, and As It Is.

Mayday Parade were announced as part of the line-up for Slam Dunk Festival on the 10 February 2016, alongside American rock band Yellowcard and more. The official music video for "Let's Be Honest" featured veteran actor and musician Michael Jason Allen as Capt. Giorgio Chavez. Mayday Parade played the 2016 Vans Warped Tour, alongside Yellowcard, We the Kings, New Found Glory and Sum 41.

A 10th anniversary edition of Tales Told by Dead Friends, featuring new packaging and an additional track "The Problem with the Big Picture Is That It's Hard to See", was released in November 2016. Following this, a 10th anniversary edition of A Lesson in Romantics was released in March 2017, featuring demos. Producer Kenneth Mount criticized the band on Twitter for not giving Lancaster credit in commentary, "I'm slightly confused why mayday parades commentary for lesson in romantics never mentions Jason Lancaster at all, voice of 50% of the album...Jason also recorded all his vocals naked for a lesson in romantics, that should totally make the commentary. I've waited ten years for that".

Sunnyland (2018–2020)
In April 2018, the band announced that they had signed to Rise Records and began teasing the release of their sixth studio album.  In their announcement, the band said, “Rise has done a fantastic job with their projects, and it’s clear that they are passionate about the music they help put out into the world. We appreciate the fact that they believe in our band still after all these years and we are so excited for everyone to hear what we’ve been working on.” On May 3, the band released "Piece of Your Heart" as the lead single from Sunnyland. The full album Sunnyland released on June 15, 2018. Mayday Parade played on the final cross-country Warped Tour in the summer of 2018.

Out Of Here EP and What It Means To Fall Apart (2020–present) 
On March 5, 2020, the band released the track "It Is What It Is".

On September 22, 2020, the band teased their upcoming EP album. "Lighten Up Kid" was released as the lead single from Out Of Here on September 24. The band's drummer Jake Bundrick stated about the lead single; “'Lighten Up Kid' is about trying to find yourself and the strength to keep fighting for what you believe in. It's about being or feeling cut down and hung out to dry but standing up for yourself in the end.”

The EP Out Of Here was released on October 16, 2020, comprises three new tracks – "Lighten Up, Kid," "First Train" and "I Can Only Hope".

On June 18, 2021, the band teased their new single "Kids Of Summer", which was released on June 22. On August 13 they teased a second single, named "Bad At Love" and released August 17. On September 23, they released a third single named "One For The Rocks And One For The Scary", while also announcing their 7th studio album, What It Means To Fall Apart, alongside the album tracklist and song titles. On October 29, they released a fourth track named "Golden Days". On November 17, they released a fifth track named "Think Of You". The seventh studio album was released November 19, 2021, it includes 12 new songs, including the 5 songs previously mentioned.

Musical style
Mayday Parade's musical style has been described as pop punk, pop rock, alternative rock, emo pop, emo, and rock. A Lesson in Romantics has been described as pop punk and emo. Anywhere but Here has been described as pop punk and pop rock. Mayday Parade has been described as pop punk and pop rock. Monsters in the Closet has been described as pop punk, pop rock and rock. Black Lines has been described as emo, emo pop, pop punk, and rock.

Side projects
After Jason Lancaster parted ways he formed a new band called Go Radio on which he released two EP's and two studio albums, the band broke up on October 7, 2013. A few months later he announced that he would release solo music, having released a song on a Fearless Records compilation, and a solo album called As You Are released in June 2014.

In 2012, guitarist and bassist Brooks Betts and Jeremy Lenzo respectively announced their band Truth or Consequence. The band consists of Betts on vocals, guitar, drums, pedal steel and banjo, Lenzo on bass and vocals, and Alexandra Kees on violin and vocals; studio members include Lee Dyess on cello and Mayday Parade's lead singer Derek Sanders on piano. The band released their debut EP titled Second Fiddle on December 25, 2013.

Band members

Current members

 Derek Sanders – lead vocals, piano, additional guitar (2005–present)
 Alex Garcia – lead guitar (2005–present)
 Brooks Betts – rhythm guitar (2005–present)
 Jeremy Lenzo – bass guitar, backing vocals (2005–present)
 Jake Bundrick – drums, percussion (2005–present), co-lead vocals (2007–present)

Former members
 Jason Lancaster – lead vocals, rhythm guitar (2005–2007)

Discography

 A Lesson in Romantics (2007)
 Anywhere but Here (2009)
 Mayday Parade (2011)
 Monsters in the Closet (2013)
 Black Lines (2015)
 Sunnyland (2018)
 What It Means to Fall Apart (2021)

Awards and nominations

Alternative Press Music Awards

Indie Star TV Awards

References
Citations

Sources

External links

Atlantic Records artists
Musical groups established in 2005
Musical groups from Tallahassee, Florida
Fearless Records artists
American punk rock groups
Alternative rock groups from Florida